Kambarka is a town in the Udmurt Republic, Russia.

Kambarka may also refer to:
Kambarka River, a river in the Udmurt Republic, Russia, on which the town of Kambarka stands
Kambarka Engineering Works, a rolling stock manufacturer in the Udmurt Republic, Russia